Trinity Episcopal Church is a historic Episcopal church complex located at Buffalo in Erie County, New York.  The oldest part of the complex was built in 1869 as the Gothic Revival style Christ Chapel; it was later redesigned in 1913. The main church was constructed in 1884–1886 in the Victorian Gothic style and features stained glass windows designed by John LaFarge and Tiffany studios. The parish house, designed by Cram, Goodhue & Ferguson, was constructed in 1905.

It was listed on the National Register Of Historic Places in 2008.

Gallery

References

External links

Trinity Episcopal Church and Christ Chapel, Buffalo as an Architectural Museum website

Churches on the National Register of Historic Places in New York (state)
Gothic Revival architecture in New York (state)
Churches completed in 1886
19th-century Episcopal church buildings
Episcopal church buildings in New York (state)
Churches in Buffalo, New York
National Register of Historic Places in Buffalo, New York
1886 establishments in New York (state)